Uniendo Fronteras (Eng.: Uniting Frontiers') is the title of a studio album released by Regional Mexican band Los Tigres del Norte. This album became their second number-one hit on the Billboard Top Latin Albums chart.

Track listing
This information from Billboard.com
Trabajo Por Mi Cuenta (Francisco Quintero) — 3:13
La Luz de Tus Ojos (Teodoro Bello) — 3:08
El Que No Había Nacido (Teodoro Bello) — 3:33
Y Dices Que Tú Me Amas (Rafael Rubio) — 3:10
Mi Fantasía (Enrique Negrete) — 3:27
Don Nadie (Jesús Meléndez) — 3:34
Somos Más Americanos (Enrique Valencia) — 3:27
De Rama en Rama (Teodoro Bello) — 3:34
El Curita y la Coqueta (Francisco Quintero) — 3:50
Recuerdos Que Duelen (Teodoro Bello) — 3:29
El Centroamericano (Enrique Franco) — 3:29
Lo Tomas o Lo Tiras (Rafael Rubio) — 3:27
Mujeres Manejando (Francisco Quintero) — 3:04
La Crónica de un Cambio (Paulino Vargas) — 2:43

Credits
This information from Allmusic
Jim Dean: Engineer
Hernán Hernández: Band
Jorge Hernández: Band
Luis Hernández: Band
Oscar Lara: Band
Rafael Rubio: Collaboration
John Coulter: Graphic design
Alan Silfen: Photography

Chart performance

Sales and certifications

References

2001 albums
Los Tigres del Norte albums
Fonovisa Records albums